Kenrickodes is a genus of moths of the family Noctuidae described by Viette in 1961. The species are known from Madagascar.

Species
Kenrickodes griseata (Kenrick, 1917)
Kenrickodes michauxi Viette, 1968
Kenrickodes pauliani Viette, 1965
Kenrickodes rubidata (Kenrick, 1917)
Kenrickodes semiumbrosa (Saalmüller, 1891)
Kenrickodes titanica (Hampson, 1910)
Kenrickodes toulgoeti Viette, 1965
Kenrickodes transcursa (Saalmüller, 1891)

References

Condicinae